Finn Christian Knudsen (born 13 October 1868) was a Norwegian engineer and politician.

He was born in Porsgrunn. He served as mayor of Eidanger from 1907 to 1910, and from 1916 to 1919. He was elected representative to the Storting for the period 1922–1924, for the Conservative Party.

Selected works
Eidanger-Porsgrund (1932)

References

1868 births
Year of death missing
Politicians from Porsgrunn
Conservative Party (Norway) politicians
Members of the Storting
Norwegian engineers
Mayors of places in Telemark